Nation Lakes Provincial Park is a provincial park in British Columbia, Canada.

External links

Provincial parks of British Columbia
Omineca Country
Regional District of Bulkley-Nechako
2004 establishments in British Columbia
Protected areas established in 2004